Nepenthes tenax (from Latin: tenax "tenacious") is a lowland species of tropical pitcher plant native to northern Queensland, Australia. It is the third Nepenthes species recorded from the continent and its second endemic species. Nepenthes tenax is closely related to the three other Australian Nepenthes species: N. mirabilis, N. rowaniae and N. parvula.

Nepenthes tenax grows to a height of around 100 cm with pitchers rarely exceeding 15 cm. The stem is usually self-supporting. In its natural habitat, it is sympatric with N. mirabilis and N. rowaniae. Simple and complex natural hybrids involving both of these species have been found.

References

Further reading

 Bateman, D. 2011. Scientists combing Cape York for new carnivorous plant. The Cairns Post, 29 April 2011.
 Bourke, G. & R. Nunn 2012. Nepenthes. In: Australian Carnivorous Plants. Redfern Natural History Productions, Poole. pp. 148–167.
 Lavarack, P.S. 1981. Nepenthes mirabilis in Australia. Carnivorous Plant Newsletter 10(3): 69–72, 74–76.
 Lowrie, A. 2013. Nepenthes tenax C.Clarke & R.Kruger. In: Carnivorous Plants of Australia Magnum Opus – Volume Three. Redfern Natural History Productions, Poole. pp. 910–913.
 McPherson, S.R. & A. Robinson 2012. Field Guide to the Pitcher Plants of Australia and New Guinea. Redfern Natural History Productions, Poole.
 Michael, P. 2008. Rare carnivorous plant in danger. The Courier Mail, 22 January 2008.
 Rat-eating plant discovered in Cape York. ABC News, 22 January 2008.
 Wilson, G.W., F. Venter, R.F. Wilson & D. Crayn 2011. Chasing Nepenthes on Cape York, Queensland. Carnivorous Plant Newsletter 40(4): 122–128.
 Nepenthes of Australia by Stewart McPherson

External links
Photograph of Nepenthes tenax in its natural habitat

Carnivorous plants of Australia
tenax
Plants described in 2006
Caryophyllales of Australia
Flora of Queensland